Ten Thirteen may refer to:

 Ten Thirteen Productions, a production company founded by Chris Carter in 1993
 10/13, in television series production, is shorthand for a role that means that although that character usually is a series regular they are only guaranteed to be in 10 out of 13 episodes.